Enborne Row is a hamlet in Berkshire, England, located on the county's border with Hampshire. The hamlet is within the civil parish of Enborne. The name Enborne comes from Old English and means duck stream.

References

External links

Hamlets in Berkshire
West Berkshire District